Vilém Petrželka (10 September 1889, Brno, Moravia – 10 January 1967, Brno) was a prominent Czech composer and conductor.

Petrželka was a pupil of Leoš Janáček, Vítězslav Novák and Karel Hoffmeister. From 1914 he taught composition at the Janáček Academy of Music and Performing Arts and the School of the Philharmonic Society in Brno.

Selected works
Orchestra
 Pochod bohémů (March of the Bohemians) (1919)
 Věčný návrat, Symphony in 3 Parts, Op.13 (1922–1923)
 Dramatická ouvertura (Preludio drammatico), Op.26 (1932)
 Partita for string orchestra, Op.31 (1934)
 Moravský tanec (Moravian Dance)
 Pastorální symfonietta, Op.51
 Symphony, Op.56 (1955–1956)

Concertante
 Concerto for violin and orchestra, Op.40

Chamber music
 String Quartet in B major, Op.2
 String Quartet in C minor, Op.6
 Zimní nálada (Winter Mood) for violin and piano (1907)
 Z intimních chvil (From Intimate Moments), 3 Pieces for violin and piano, Op.9 (1918)
 Fantasie for string quartet, Op.19 (1927)
 Sonata for cello solo, Op.23 (1930)
 Sonata for violin and piano, Op.29 (1933)
 Piano Trio, Op.32 (1937)
 4 Impromptus for violin and piano, Op.36 (1940)
 Divertimento for woodwind quintet, Op.39 (1941)
 Serenáda for flute, oboe, clarinet, horn, bassoon, violin, viola, cello and double bass (1945)
 String Quartet No.5, Op.43 (1947)
 Dvě skladby (2 Pieces) for cello (or viola) and piano, Op.45 (1947)
 Miniatury for woodwind quintet (1953)
 Sonatina for violin and piano (1953)
 Suite for string quartet

Piano
 Andante cantabile
 Drobné klavírní skladby
 Svatební suita (Wedding Suite) (1912)
 Písně poezie i prozy (Songs in Verse and Prose), Op.8 (1917)
 Suite for piano, Op.22 (1943)
 Pět prostých skladeb, Op.47
 Pět nálad (5 Moods), Op.55 (1954)

Vocal
 Živly (Elements), Song Cycle for baritone and orchestra, Op.7 (1917)
 Samoty duše (Solitude of the Heart; Einsamkeiten der Seele), 4 Songs for voice and piano, Op.10 (1919)
 Cesta (The Path; Der Weg), Song Cycle for tenor and chamber orchestra, Op.14 (1924)
 Dvojí noc – Odpočinutí for voice and piano, Op.25
 Přírodní snímky (Natural Images), Song Cycle for voice and piano, Op.30 (1933)
 Písně milostné (Love Songs) for voice and piano, Op.35 (1943); words by Bábá Táhir Urján
 Písně v lidovém tónu (Songs in Folk Tone) for voice and piano
 Štafeta for voice and string quartet

Choral
 Jitřní píseň (Morning Song) for male chorus and piano
 Námořník Mikuláš, Oratorio (Symphonic Drama) for soloists, narrator, mixed chorus, orchestra, jazz orchestra and organ      
 Slováckou pěšinou, Folk Songs for male chorus, Op.12 (1921)
 To je má zem for male chorus, Op.37; words by Jaroslav Zatloukal

External links
 List of works
 Article on Petrzelka 
 

1889 births
1967 deaths
Musicians from Brno
People from the Margraviate of Moravia
Czech composers
Czech male composers
Czech conductors (music)
Male conductors (music)
Pupils of Leoš Janáček
Pupils of Vítězslav Novák
20th-century conductors (music)
20th-century Czech male musicians